Astro Hua Hee Dai is a 24-hour in-house Hokkien-generic TV channel in Malaysia. It is the fourth in-house Chinese channel provided by pay TV provider, Astro, after Astro Wah Lai Toi, Astro AEC and Astro Shuang Xing, and was launched on 13 October 2007 with other channels such as Astro Xiao Tai Yang, Asian Food Channel and KBS World. Bahasa Malaysia subtitles are provided.

During the debut of its HD channel version, only about 50% of the content were simulcast with the SD feed until 2016.

External links
Official Website of Astro Hua Hee Dai

Astro Malaysia Holdings television channels
Hokkien
Television channels and stations established in 2007